Petro Yukhymovych Vesklyarov ( in Talne, Ukraine – January 5, 1994 in Kyiv) was a Ukrainian theater and television actor. He was also known by the nickname Did Panas (Grandpa Panas).

Between 1932 and 1940, Vesklyarov was an actor in a travelling workers' theatre, and between 1946 and 1959 he performed at the Taras Shevchenko Musical-Drama Theatre in Lutsk, Volyn. Between 1959 and 1982 Veslklyarov worked in the Dovzhenko Film Studios, appearing in a number of films. He starred in the 1959 drama film Ivanna and appeared in the 1970 comedy film Two Days of Miracles. During this time (1964-1986) he appeared as the character "Дід Панас" (Grandpa Panas) in the Ukrainian television series "На добраніч, діти"  (Goodnight, children).

In 1973, he was awarded the title Meritorious Artist of the Ukrainian SSR.

Commemoration 
He was buried in the columbarium of the Baikove cemetery. The widow left for the United States, before handing over the films with the recordings of "Grandpa Panas" to the Kapranov brothers.

In 2019, a memorial plaque was installed on the premises of the Talne school, where the house where Petro Veskliarov was born stood. In 2022, in Talne, Cherkasy region, Krylov Street became Veskliarov Street.

References

External links

1911 births
1994 deaths
People from Talne
People from Umansky Uyezd
Ukrainian Jews
Ukrainian male stage actors
Ukrainian male television actors
20th-century Ukrainian male actors
Ukrainian television presenters
Soviet military personnel of World War II from Ukraine
Recipients of the title of Merited Artist of Ukraine
Burials at Baikove Cemetery
Soviet actors